Nortjé or Nortje is a surname. Notable people with the surname include:

Anrich Nortje (born 1993), South African cricketer
Arthur Nortje (1942–1970), South African poet
Christoffel Nortje, South African dentist and emeritus professor
Jan Nortje (born 1975), South African kickboxer
Obert Nortjé (born 1997), Namibian rugby union player
Ossie Nortjé (born 1990), South African rugby union player
Piet Nortje, South African author of 32 Battalion: The Inside Story of South Africa's Elite Fighting Unit
Ruan Nortjé (born 1998), South African rugby union player
Ruth Nortje (born 1967), South African-born, American canoer